Johan Leopold Stumpf (19 May 1880 – 24 August 1944) was a Norwegian gymnast who competed in the 1906 Summer Olympics.
in Athens, Greece.

Johan Leopold Stumpf was born at Kristiansand in Vest-Agder, Norway. He was the son of Ladislav Leopold Stumpf (1856-1944) and Amalie Gudine Olausdatter
(1851-1927). He competed as a member of the  Kristiansands Turnforening gymnastics club. In 1906, he won the gold medal as a member of the Norwegian gymnastics team in the Gymnastics Team Combined Exercises at the  Intercalated Olympic Games.  He later emigrated to Texas.

References

1880 births
1944 deaths
Sportspeople from Kristiansand
Norwegian male artistic gymnasts
Olympic gymnasts of Norway
Gymnasts at the 1906 Intercalated Games
Olympic gold medalists for Norway
Norwegian emigrants to the United States
Medalists at the 1906 Intercalated Games
20th-century Norwegian people